Paramita (He Xuntian)  ( 波罗密多 ) is a work for music ceremony
composed by He Xuntian.
1300 performers made a debut of it on Oct.25th 2002  at Leifeng Pagoda in Hangzhou, China.

Summary 
Paramita has ten movements: 
 Cloud Bells 云钟
 Paramita 波罗密多
 Song of the Enlightenment 阿耨多罗三藐三菩提
 Song of Pipa 琵琶行
 Monks 群僧
 Heart Sutra 般若心经
 Earth Drums 尘鼓
 Dance of the White Snake 白蛇舞
 Spring Song 春歌
 Moons upon a Thousand River 千江月

References

External links

Compositions by He Xuntian
2002 compositions